Jews in the Middle East and North Africa is a non-profit organization headquartered in San Francisco, California that is dedicated to the preservation of Mizrahi and Sephardi culture and history, and seeks to educate the public and advocate for Jewish refugees from the Middle East.

Prior to 1948, approximately 950,000 Jews lived in Muslim countries of the Middle East, North Africa, and the Persian Gulf.

Historical background 

The Jewish exodus from Arab and Muslim lands in the 20th century was a result of the expulsion and mass departure primarily of Sephardi and Mizrahi background from Arab and Islamic countries. The migration started in the late 19th century, but accelerated after the 1948 Arab–Israeli War. According to official Arab statistics, 856,000 Jews left their homes in Arab countries from 1948 until the early 1970s. Some 600,000 resettled in Israel, leaving behind property valued today at more than $300 billion. Jewish-owned real-estate left behind in Arab lands has been estimated at 100,000 square kilometers (four times the size of the State of Israel). Thus, of the nearly 900,000 Jewish refugees from Arab lands, approximately 600,000 were absorbed by Israel; the remainder went to Europe and the Americas.

Political activities

JIMENA played a key role in the unanimous passage of House Resolution 185 by the U.S. Foreign Affairs Committee on Wednesday, February 27, 2008. This resolution urges the President to ensure that when refugees from the Middle East are discussed in international forums, any reference to Palestinian refugees be matched by a similarly explicit reference to Jewish and other refugee populations.

In December 2007 JIMENA briefed Iraqi-born Ruth Pearl, mother of slain journalist Daniel Pearl, before her meeting with the President at the Hanukka White House party. She informed President Bush, for the first time ever, of the plight of the 850,000 Jewish refugees from the Middle East and North Africa. During the President's recent visit to Israel, he was reported to have mentioned the importance of including the Jewish refugees in future negotiations about refugees of the Middle East.

In March 2008, JIMENA testified at the United Nations Human Rights Council in Geneva, Switzerland, on behalf of Jewish refugees from the Middle East and North Africa.

Joe Wahed was the founder of JIMENA. Current board members include noted human rights advocate Gina Waldman, executive film producer and co-founder of the David Project Ralph Avi Goldwasser, Varda Rabin (wife of the noted Jewish philanthropist Irving Rabin), and Professor Henry Green of the University of Miami, director of the Sephardi Voices project.

In January 2019, JIMENA issued a "Sephardic and Mizrahi Communal Response" to Jewish Voice for Peace. JIMENA criticized JVP's anti-Zionism and invocation of Mizrahi and Sephardi history to critique the State of Israel.

See also 
Arab–Israeli conflict
Antisemitism in the Arab world
History of the Jews under Muslim rule
Islam and antisemitism
Jewish population
Jewish refugees
Jews outside Europe under Axis occupation
Arab Jews
Mizrahi Jews

External links
Official website
Exodus Today
‘Jews Are Our Dogs'
The vanishing Jews of the Arab world

References

Arab-American culture in California
Arab-Jewish culture in the United States
Human rights organizations based in the United States
Jewish-American political organizations
Mizrahi Jewish culture in the United States
Sephardi Jewish culture in California
Zionism in the United States
Zionist organizations
Organizations based in San Francisco
Jewish exodus from Arab and Muslim countries